Nicole David is a soca music artist from Saint Lucia.  She is referred to as "St. Lucia's Queen of Soca"  and was a member of the soca band DN5. She is now the lead vocalist of the band Spectacle.

Carnival competition record
Nicole won the roadmarch during St Lucia Carnival 2005 with her song "Bounce". She placed third on two occasions in the St Lucia Soca Monarch competition (2004 and 2005), but decided not to participate in the competition in 2006. She represented St. Lucia in the Queen of Soca Competition in Trinidad and placed 7th.

Style
Her performance style has been compared to  the performance style of
Barbadian soca artiste Alison Hinds. (That explains why Nicole David had decided to imitate her in the first place)

Digicel
She has a sponsorship contract with Digicel, which includes a video for her hit "Bounce".

Notable songs
 "Jammette" (St. Lucia Soca 2007)
 "Wukking up is we Culture" (St. Lucia Soca 1999)
 Mischievous" (St. Lucia Soca 2006)
 "What a Feeling" (St. Lucia Soca 2006)
 "Road Block" (St. Lucia Soca 2007)
 "Bounce" (St. Lucian Road March 2005)
 "Mate'" (St. Lucia Soca 2004)
 "Jabal"

Notes

Year of birth missing (living people)
Living people
Soca musicians
Saint Lucian women singers
21st-century women singers